Väinö Tanner (1881–1948) was a Finnish geographer, geologist, professor and diplomat. Tanner is best known for his studies on the Quaternary geology of northern Finland. He was a vocal opponent to the Finnicization of the University of Helsinki.

References

1881 births
1948 deaths
Finnish geographers
Finnish geologists
Finnish geomorphologists
Quaternary geologists
Academic staff of the University of Helsinki
Finnish diplomats
Finnish expatriates in Sweden
Ambassadors of Finland to Romania
Ambassadors of Finland to Turkey
Ambassadors of Finland to Greece
20th-century geographers
20th-century geologists